Walter Hixon Isnogle was an American impressionist artist from Indiana. Isnogle was known for his participation in the Indianapolis City Hospital Project.

Walter Hixon Isnogle was born in Ohio in 1887 and lived most of his life in Indianapolis. He married Ruth Collier (b. 1891).

Career

Walter Hixon Isnogle was a student of the John Herron Institute in Indianapolis, IN. “Though little information is published about Isnogle, his participation in the City Hospital project is well-documented.” Isnogle was one of several artists to participate in the project, and was also one of many Hoosier Group artists to have participated in the project led by William Forsyth.

References

Year of birth missing
Year of death missing
Painters from Indiana
20th-century American painters
American male painters
American Impressionist painters
20th-century American male artists